Cyril I may refer to:

 Cyril of Alexandria, Patriarch of Alexandria in 412–444
 Cyril I of Constantinople, Ecumenical Patriarch in 1612, 1620–23, 1623–33, 1633–34, 1634–35 and 1637–38
 Cyril of Bulgaria, Patriarch in 1953–1971
 Cyril I of Moscow and All Russia, since 2009